Complete Demos is the compendium of Tally Hall's first two EP disks, Welcome to Tally Hall and Party Boobytrap, both of which were recorded in Joe Hawley's attic. "Good Day" won Andrew Horowitz $10,000 in the 2004 BMI Foundation's John Lennon Scholarship Competition. "Just Apathy" was named the Grand Prize Winners for Session II of the 2005 John Lennon Songwriting Contest in the pop music category. In addition to Welcome to Tally Hall and Party Boobytrap, Tally Hall recorded the Pingry EP demo disk which primarily consisted of acoustic one-take demos.  Several songs from the Pingry disk were re-recorded in addition to songs from Complete Demos and others to form Marvin's Marvelous Mechanical Museum.

Track listing

Personnel

Tally Hall
Rob Cantor – vocals, guitar, songwriting
Joe Hawley – vocals, guitar, songwriting
Zubin Sedghi – bass, vocals, co-songwriting (3)
Andrew Horowitz – keyboards, percussion, vocals, songwriting
Steve Gallagher – drums
 Ross Federman, though credited as the drummer, does not play on this release, as he had joined after the songs were recorded.

Additional musicians
Brian Kaufman - tuba (3)
Alaina Alster - trombone (3)
Adam Dixon - trumpet (3)

Technical personnel
Tally Hall - producer
Joe Hawley - engineer (1, 2, 3, 7, 8, 9), album design, photography
Rob Cantor - engineer (4, 5, 6)
Zubin Sedghi - engineer (5)
Steve Gallagher - engineer (5)
Ashley Hurst - photography

References

2004 albums
Tally Hall albums